Sandra Lindkvist  (born 15 December 1991) is a Swedish football defender who played for Växjö DFF in the Swedish Damallsvenskan. She has previously played for Swedish clubs IF Brommapojkarna, Djurgårdens IF, and AIK.

References

External links 
 

1991 births
Living people
Swedish women's footballers
IF Brommapojkarna players
Djurgårdens IF Fotboll (women) players
Damallsvenskan players
Women's association football defenders
Växjö DFF players